Hemiexarnis moechilla is a moth of the family Noctuidae. It is found in China.

Noctuinae